Eumorpha phorbas is a moth of the  family Sphingidae.

Distribution 
It is known from Ecuador, Colombia, Suriname, Bolivia, Guatemala, Nicaragua, Costa Rica, Belize and Mexico.

Description 
The wingspan is 112–116 mm. It is similar to Eumorpha labruscae labruscae in the largely green upperside of the body and forewings, but can be distinguished by the lacking blue patches on the hindwing upperside, instead showing essentially the same pattern of orange and dark brown as in Eumorpha capronnieri. There is a pair of broad, brown subdorsal stripes on the upperside of the thorax and abdomen. The undersides of the wings and body are almost entirely yellow.

Biology 
Adults are on wing year round. They nectar at various flowers.

The larvae probably feed on Vitaceae, Apocynaceae or Onagraceae species.

References

Eumorpha
Moths described in 1775
Taxa named by Pieter Cramer